Marinobacterium aestuariivivens  is a Gram-negative, aerobic and motile bacterium from the genus of Marinobacterium which has been isolated from tidal flat from the Yellow Sea in Korea.

References

External links
Type strain of Marinobacterium aestuariivivens at BacDive -  the Bacterial Diversity Metadatabase

 

Alteromonadales
Bacteria described in 2016